A prunt is a small blob of glass fused to another piece of glass.  Prunts are applied primarily as decoration, but also help provide a firm grip in the absence of a handle.  Prunts may be impressed into decorative shapes, such as raspberries, blackberries, or lion's heads.

Prunts are a common stylistic element in German glassware, such as the rummer and Berkemeyer styles of drinking glass.

Notes

References 
 </references>
 
 

Glass art